Tarisai Mahlunge, born 21 April 1988 in Harare, is a Zimbabwean cricketer who played in the 2006 U-19 Cricket World Cup in Sri Lanka. He is a wicket-keeper and left-handed batsman and has played first-class and List A cricket for the Centrals cricket team in Zimbabwe.

References

1988 births
Living people
Zimbabwean cricketers
Midlands cricketers
Centrals cricketers
Mashonaland Eagles cricketers